Blaine Township may refer to:
 Blaine Township, Ida County, Iowa
 Blaine Township, Wright County, Iowa
 Blaine Township, Clay County, Kansas
 Blaine Township, Marion County, Kansas
 Blaine Township, Ottawa County, Kansas, in Ottawa County, Kansas
 Blaine Township, Smith County, Kansas, in Smith County, Kansas
 Blaine Township, Michigan
 Blaine Township, Adams County, Nebraska
 Blaine Township, Antelope County, Nebraska
 Blaine Township, Cuming County, Nebraska
 Blaine Township, Kearney County, Nebraska
 Blaine Township, Bottineau County, North Dakota
 Blaine Township, Pennsylvania
 Blaine Township, Clark County, South Dakota, in Clark County, South Dakota
 Blaine Township, Jerauld County, South Dakota, in Jerauld County, South Dakota

Township name disambiguation pages